Glory is high renown, praise, and honor obtained by notable achievements, and based in extensive common consent. In Greek culture fame and glory were highly considered, as it is explained in The Symposium, one of Plato's dialogs.

In Greek culture (Kleos)

Kleos (Greek: κλέος) is the Greek word often translated to "renown", or "glory". It is related to the word "to hear" and carries the implied meaning of "what others hear about you". A Greek hero earns kleos through accomplishing great deeds, often through his own death. Kleos is invariably transferred from father to son; the son is responsible for carrying on and building upon the "glory" of the father.

Kleos is a common theme in Homer's epics, the Iliad and the Odyssey, the main example in the latter being that of Odysseus and his son Telemachus, who is concerned that his father may have died a pathetic and pitiable death at sea rather than a reputable and gracious one in battle.

Plato
The Greek philosopher Plato, in his dialog Symposium devoted to discuss love, makes a digression into the subject of fame and glory. It is in the section that deals with the dialog between Socrates and Diotima. She is explaining that men search ways to reach some kind of immortality, for instance by means of physical and intellectual procreation. Then asserts that the love for fame and glory is very strong, and in fact to obtain them, men are ready to engage in great efforts, and also run risks and sacrifices, even of their lives (self-sacrifice), and still more for this than for their children.  Then makes concrete references to Alcestis that died to save Admetus, or Achilles to avenge Patroclus, and to Codrus, as examples of heroes in search of fame and immortal renown.

Plato believed "There's a victory, and defeat; the first and best of victories, the lowest and worst of defeats which each man gains or sustains at the hands not of another, but of himself." and "The first and best victory is to conquer self. To be conquered by self is, of all things, the most shameful and vile." Plato emphasized that victory is self-motivated, while glory is to benefit future victory.

Jorge Manrique
Jorge Manrique was a prominent Spanish poet of the fifteenth century. His most celebrated work was Coplas a la Muerte de su Padre (Stanzas about the death of his father) that was translated into the English language by poet Henry Wadsworth Longfellow. In it is an explanation of the three lives of men:
The terrestrial life, that ends with the death
The life of fame, that is retained by men's memory.
The eternal life, of the Christian faith.

The life of fame is expressed in the following verses:
No se os haga tan amarga         (Should not be so bitter)		
la batalla temerosa              (The fearsome battle)		
que esperáis,                    (you are facing)		
pues otra vida más larga         (since a longer life)		
de la fama gloriosa              (of glorious fame)		
acá dejáis,                      (here you are leaving)

See also
 Praise 
 Honour
 Laureate
 Civil awards and decorations
 Military awards and decorations
 Thumos (concept)
 Victory

References

Ancient Greek culture
Popularity
Honor